A total solar eclipse occurred on January 24, 1925. A solar eclipse occurs when the Moon passes between Earth and the Sun, thereby totally or partly obscuring the image of the Sun for a viewer on Earth. A total solar eclipse occurs when the Moon's apparent diameter is larger than the Sun's, blocking all direct sunlight, turning day into darkness. Totality occurs in a narrow path across Earth's surface, with the partial solar eclipse visible over a surrounding region thousands of kilometres wide. Totality was visible from southwestern and southeastern Quebec in Canada, and the United States, including Toronto, Niagara Falls and the northern part of New York City.

Observations 

It was seen in New York City. It was reported that those above 96th Street in Manhattan saw a total solar eclipse while those below 96th Street saw a partial eclipse.

Visual and radio observations were conducted by researchers working with Scientific American.

Related eclipses

Solar eclipses 1924–1928

Saros 120

Tritos series

Metonic series

See also
 List of solar eclipses visible from the United Kingdom 1000–2090 AD

Notes

References
 NASA gif of plot of solar eclipse
 Foto and sketchs of Solar Corona January 24, 1925
 Total Solar Eclipse of January 24, 1925 in New York

Further reading

External links

1925 01 24
1925 in science
1925 01 24
January 1925 events